Gymnopilus tuxtlensis is a species of mushroom in the family Hymenogastraceae.

See also

List of Gymnopilus species

External links
Gymnopilus tuxtlensis at Index Fungorum

tuxtlensis